Parkland High School is part of the Ysleta Independent School District in El Paso, Texas.

Notable alumni
Mike Jefferson, former NFL player
Mike Wiliams, former NFL player

References

External links
 
 

Ysleta Independent School District high schools
Educational institutions established in 1962
High schools in El Paso, Texas
Magnet schools in Texas